Mazdacis consimilis is a species of snout moth in the genus Mazdacis. It was described by Paul Dognin in 1911. It is found in Guyana.

References

Moths described in 1911
Epipaschiinae